Oveis Kordjahan (born April 13, 1985) is an Iranian footballer who plays for ُSahrdari Mahshahr in Division 2.

Club career
In 2007, Kordjahan joined Pas Hamedan.

Club career statistics

 Assist Goals

References

1985 births
People from Sari, Iran
Living people
Pas players
Iranian footballers
Tarbiat Yazd players
Aluminium Hormozgan F.C. players
Mes Sarcheshme players
Sportspeople from Sari, Iran
Association football defenders